Jordan Travis (born May 2, 2000) is an American football quarterback who plays college football for the Florida State Seminoles and previously played football for the Louisville Cardinals.

Biography  
Travis was born in West Palm Beach, Florida, and attended Palm Beach Central High School. After his Sophomore year, he transferred to The Benjamin School where he graduated in 2018. Coming out of high school he was ranked No. 24 dual-threat quarterback by 247Sports. His Brother Devon Travis, played baseball at Florida State under Mike Martin.

College career

Louisville 
Travis began his college career committing to the Louisville Cardinals over the Baylor Bears. Playing just 3 games, he completed 4-of-14 passing and 40 on the ground. On November 2018, Travis announced he would be transferring.

Florida State 

On Dec. 22, 2018 Travis announced he would be transferring to Florida State. He has spent four seasons with the Florida State Seminoles and announced a return for a fifth season in December 2022.

Statistics

References  

2000 births
Living people
Louisville Cardinals football players
Florida State Seminoles football players
American football quarterbacks